Anne Szarewski (1 September 1959 – 24 August 2013) was a doctor who helped improve how cervical screening samples are tested and was involved in developing the human papillomavirus (HPV) vaccine.

Early life and education 

Anne Szarewski was born in London in 1959, the only child of older Polish parents. She went to Streatham and Clapham High School for Girls before studying medicine at London's Middlesex Hospital, graduating MBBS in 1982.

Career 

Szarewski began her career as a doctor at the Whittington Hospital and Royal Free Hospital. She then moved into family planning and sexual health, joining the Margaret Pyke Centre in 1986. She trained in colposcopy at the Royal Northern Hospital under Mr Albert Singer. It was here she developed her interest in cervical cancer detection and screening.

Her academic career began in 1992 at the Mathematics, Statistics and Epidemiology Laboratory of the Imperial Cancer Research Fund, one of the forerunners of Cancer Research UK and continued after 2002 at the Wolfson Institute of Preventive Medicine, Queen Mary University of London.

Szarewski became the editor of the Journal of Family Planning and Reproductive Health Care in 2003.

Research 

Szarewski gained her PhD in ‘The effect of cessation of smoking on cervical lesion size and immune cell parameters’, where she showed that, in the absence of treatment, early signs of cervical disease that were picked up through screening in smokers were much more likely to disappear if women gave up smoking. While completing her PhD she also worked on HPV testing for cervical cancer with Jack Cuzick. Szarewski was the clinical lead on the study that showed that testing for the presence of HPV DNA in cells taken during cervical screening would pick up cases of pre-cancer that were missed by the routine test.

This work was followed by a larger trial testing HPV screening – the HART study. Published in 2003, evidence from this played a role in the decision of the International Agency for Research on Cancer (IARC) to recommended that HPV testing could be used in primary cervical screening in 2004.

Szarewski was also a chief investigator, principal investigator and author on key HPV vaccine trials, helping to develop the bivalent HPV vaccine, Cervarix.

Books 

Szarewski wrote several books:

1988: Cervical Smear Test   
1989: The Breast Book  
1991: Hormonal Contraception  
1994: Contraception   
1995: A woman's guide to the cervical smear test   
1996: The cervical smear test   
1998: Contraception  
2003: Contraceptive dilemmas   
2004: Contraception  
2006: Contraceptive dilemmas

Personal life 

Szarewski married South African journalist Lester Venter when she was in her 40s. She loved reading, theatre, classical music and art exhibitions.

According to a tribute in The BMJ, Szarewski was a ‘lover of the  arts’. Classical music was her first love, with Richard Wagner her favourite composer, but she also enjoyed David Bowie – one colleague said she had visited the David Bowie exhibition at the V&A museum twice because she enjoyed it so much.

Death

Szarewski died unexpectedly in her sleep on 24 August 2013 at her home in West Hampstead, five days before her 54th birthday. An inquest later found that she had died of acute haemorrhagic pancreatitis.

References 

People educated at Streatham and Clapham High School
1959 births
2013 deaths
Academics of Queen Mary University of London
20th-century British medical doctors
21st-century British medical doctors
English women medical doctors
British people of Polish descent
British medical researchers
Cancer researchers
Cancer research
20th-century English women
20th-century English people
21st-century English women
21st-century English people